Steve Randy Waldman (born 1970) is a computer programmer and writer known for his commentary on contemporary economics at his blog Interfluidity. Educated at the New College of Florida, and University of Kentucky, Waldman is a Java programmer and wrote the c3p0 tool. He is most well known for his economics posts at Interfluidity, which have been cited by Paul Krugman,  Tyler Cowen, Simon Wren-Lewis, The Economist, CNBC, the National Review, Justin Fox of Time magazine, and Matt Levine. Waldman supports a basic income (or other ways to provide a strong social safety net) and otherwise describes himself as "Danish libertarian".

Waldman is known for his criticism of financial regulation: James Kwak quotes "An enduring truth about financial regulation is this: Given the discretion to do so, financial regulators will always do the wrong thing." Paul Krugman of the New York Times often cites Waldman; he talks about him 'going medieval' on Ezra Klein, and another time: "we are indeed, as Steve Randy Waldman says, all dorks".

The writer and novelist Adelle Waldman is  Waldman's sister. His mother, Jacqueline Waldman, was a chemistry professor at Goucher College.

References

External links
 interfluidity, Waldman's blog
 c3p0, Waldman's tool for "JDBC3 Connection and Statement Pooling"

American economics writers
American male non-fiction writers
American libertarians
1970 births
Living people
American bloggers
21st-century American non-fiction writers
American male bloggers